An Early Frost is a 1985 American made-for-television drama film. It was the first major film with major motion picture stars, Aidan Quinn, Gena Rowlands, Ben Gazzara, and Sylvia Sidney, broadcast on a major television network, NBC, to deal with the topic of AIDS. It was viewed by 34 million households in its initial airing, the highest rated show of the night, even beating Monday Night Football, received 14 Emmy nominations, winning three including Best Original Teleplay, a Peabody Award, as well as multiple Golden Globe nominations, including one for Sylvia Sidney who won for Best Supporting Actress. It was a major breakthrough into mass culture, as it was the first time an American audience of that size saw a film about a gay man who had AIDS, which up until then was considered a gay disease.

It was first broadcast on the NBC television network on November 11, 1985. It was directed by John Erman, from the Emmy Award-winning teleplay written by Ron Cowen and Daniel Lipman (story by Sherman Yellen). Aidan Quinn stars as Michael Pierson, a Chicago attorney who goes home to break the news that he is gay and has AIDS to his parents, played by Ben Gazzara and Gena Rowlands.

Storyline

Michael Pierson, a successful lawyer, suffers a bad coughing jag at work and is rushed to the hospital. There he learns from a doctor that he has been exposed to HIV.  At home, he receives another piece of disturbing news: his lover, Peter (D. W. Moffett), confesses that he had sex outside the relationship because Michael is a workaholic and is living in the closet. Michael, in a rage, throws Peter out of the house.  He then travels to his parents' home to inform them that he is gay and has AIDS.

Michael's father, Nick (Ben Gazzara), is a lumber company owner, and his wife, Kate (Gena Rowlands), is a former concert pianist, housewife, and grandmother. The couple's daughter, Susan (Sydney Walsh) is married and has a child. Nick reacts angrily to the news, while Kate attempts to adapt to the situation. Nick initially refuses to speak to Michael for a day before breaking silence by saying, "I never thought the day would come when you'd be in front of me and I wouldn't know who you are." Susan, who is pregnant, refuses to see Michael, saying that she "can't take that chance," and Nick explodes when Michael tries to kiss Kate. Kate remembers reading in a magazine article that HIV is not transmitted through casual contact and tries to get the rest of the family to accept Michael (Gena Rowlands also taped a public service announcement about HIV transmission). Michael eventually winds up in the hospital (after paramedics who are called to his parents' house refuse to transport him to the hospital) and meets a fellow patient named Victor (John Glover), a flamboyant homosexual with AIDS. The film depicts Victor's death and shows a nurse throwing Victor's few possessions into a garbage bag because she fears that the items could be contaminated.

Afterwards, Michael returns home and discovers Peter came to visit, and the two quickly reconcile. Peter asks Michael to go back home with him, but Michael insists that he cannot. As he continues to struggle coping with his diagnosis, Michael attempts suicide by carbon monoxide poisoning, but is stopped by Nick. The two argue and Nick insists that Michael keep fighting. The film ends with Michael taking a taxi cab back to Chicago, telling his parents he loves them before he goes.

Cast
 Aidan Quinn as Michael Pierson
 Sylvia Sidney as Beatrice McKenna
 Ben Gazzara as Nick Pierson
 Gena Rowlands as Katherine Pierson
 Sydney Walsh as Susan Maracek
 Terry O'Quinn as Dr. Redding
 John Glover as Victor Mitado
 Bill Paxton as Bob Maracek
 D. W. Moffett as Peter Hilton
 Cheryl Anderson as Christine
 Christopher Bradley as Todd
 Sue Ann Gilfillan as Nurse Lincoln
 Don Hood as Dr. Gilbert
 Barbara Hey as Meredith
 Scott Jaeck as Phil

Development

The teleplay for the film by Ron Cowen and Daniel Lipman spent two years in development and underwent at least thirteen rewrites before the Standards and Practices division at the network accepted it for airing.

Reviews, awards, and aftermath
Tom Shales of The Washington Post called An Early Frost "the most important TV movie of the year."

The film was number one in the Nielsen ratings during the night it aired, garnering a 23.3 share and watched by 34 million people (the film outperformed a San Francisco 49ers-Denver Broncos game broadcast on ABC and a Cagney & Lacey episode on CBS). The film was nominated for 14 Emmy Awards and won three, including Outstanding Writing For a Movie or Miniseries for Cowen and Lipman for their teleplay. Gena Rowlands, Ben Gazzara, Aidan Quinn, Sylvia Sidney and John Glover were all nominated for their performances, as was John Erman for his direction. The film was nominated for the Golden Globe Award for Best Television movie and won Sylvia Sidney the Golden Globe Award for Best Supporting Actress in a Series, Miniseries or a TV Movie. It also won the Peabody Award. The network, however, lost $500,000 in revenue because advertisers were leery about sponsoring the film. The film conveyed the prejudices surrounding HIV/AIDS at the time and the then common limited understanding by the general public of the methods of transmission and likelihood of infection.

References

External links

1985 television films
1985 films
1985 drama films
1985 LGBT-related films
American LGBT-related television films
Gay-related films
HIV/AIDS in American films
Films directed by John Erman
Peabody Award-winning broadcasts
NBC network original films
NBC Productions films
HIV/AIDS in television
American drama television films
1980s American films